Lynch Glacier lies to the north and northwest of Mount Daniel, in the U.S. state of Washington. Lynch Glacier is within the Alpine Lakes Wilderness of Snoqualmie National Forest. An arête divides the glacier into an eastern and western lobe, with the western section being the larger. In the late 1970s, Lynch Glacier extended into Pea Soup Lake; however, repeat photography indicates the glacier has since retreated above the lake.

See also
List of glaciers in the United States

References

Glaciers of the North Cascades
Glaciers of King County, Washington
Glaciers of Washington (state)